The Al-Fatiha Foundation was an organization which advanced the civil, political, and legal rights of LGBTQ+ Muslims. It was founded in 1997 by Faisal Alam, a Pakistani American LGBTQ+ rights activist, and was registered as a nonprofit organization in the United States until 2011.

History

Alam founded Al-Fatiha in November of 1997. The organization grew out of an internet listserve for questioning Muslims from 25 countries, and by October 1998 had developed numerous in-person chapters. At its height, Al-Fatiha had 14 chapters in the United States, as well as offices in England, Canada, Spain, Turkey, and South Africa.

The name "Al-Fatiha" means "the Opening." It is also the name of the first chapter of the Qur'an. In the beginning of that chapter ('surah'), God is described as compassionate and merciful; the organization's founders believe that these attributes characterize Islam, rather than hatred and homophobia.
Each year, Al-Fatiha hosted an international membership retreat and conference. Early conferences took place in Boston, New York, and London in the late 1990s and early 2000s, and focused on issues such as the reconciliation of religion and sexual orientation. The last Al-Fatiha conference was held in 2005 in Atlanta, Georgia.

Fatwa

In 2001, Al-Muhajiroun, an international organization seeking the establishment of a global Islamic caliphate, issued a fatwa declaring that all members of Al-Fatiha were murtadd, or apostates, and condemning them to death. Because of the threat and coming from conservative societies, many members of the foundation's site still prefer to be anonymous so as to protect their identity while continuing a tradition of secrecy.

Challenges
While Al-Fatiha worked to combat homophobia within Muslim communities, it also felt it faced the challenge of seeking to avoid provoking an Islamophobic reaction among non-Muslims.

After the organization's founder, Faisal Alam, stepped down, subsequent leaders failed to sustain the organization. It began a process of legal dissolution in 2011.

See also

 Liberal movements in Islam
 Lut, source of Qur'anic injunctions against homosexuality
 Homosexuality and Islam
 Board member Daayiee Abdullah

References

External links
 Al-Fatiha homepage (website discontinued since 2009)
 Muslim Alliance for Sexual and Gender Diversity (Founded 2013, USA)
 Imaan, UK Muslim LGBT support organisation

LGBT Muslim organizations
International LGBT political advocacy groups
LGBT political advocacy groups in the United States
Islamic charities based in the United States
Liberal and progressive movements within Islam
1997 establishments in the United States
2011 disestablishments in the United States
Islamic organizations established in 1997
Organizations disestablished in 2011
1997 in LGBT history
2000s in LGBT history
1990s in Islam

LGBT religious organizations in the United States